The Dakota College at Bottineau Lumberjacks Ice Hockey are a Junior Collegiate ice hockey team from Bottineau, North Dakota.  The Lumberjacks are one of seven sanctioned sports at Dakota College at Bottineau, a member of the National Junior College Athletic Association (NJCAA).

The Lumberjacks play their home games at the 800-seat Bottineau Community Arena, also referred to as the Lumberdome.

Dakota College play roughly a 30-game season schedule against NJCAA opponents, and various ACHA, NCAA Division III teams, college JV teams, and Jr. A teams.

History
The Lumberjacks have won the NJCAA National Championships ten times: 1986, 1991, 1998, 2003, 2007, 2008, 2009, 2010, 2016, and 2017.

During the 2005–06 season, the team participated in the Junior A Superior International Junior Hockey League.

Season-by-season results

Notable alumni
Ryan Bartle (2005-06) - Twin City Cyclones (SPHL), Mississippi Surge (SPHL)
Jed Johnsen (2007-09) - Evansville Icemen (AAHL), Queen City Storm (AAHL)
Dustin Penner (2000-02) - AHL, NHL
Pierre Sörensson (2008-10) - Töreboda HF (Sweden 2nd tier)
Caesar Dall'Ara (2011-12)- Sc Auer Aurorafrogs (Italy2)

References

External links
 

College men's ice hockey teams in the United States
Ice hockey teams in North Dakota
Bottineau County, North Dakota
Ice hockey clubs established in 1975
1975 establishments in North Dakota